Didier is a 1997 French comedy film written and directed by Alain Chabat. It stars Jean-Pierre Bacri and Alain Chabat. Chabat received a César Award for Best Debut in 1998.

Plot 
Jean-Pierre, a soccer agent, has agreed to keep Didier, the dog of friend and film journalist Annabelle. During the night, the Labrador is transformed into a human, at least in appearance, but Didier is still a dog psychologically. Confronted by Richard, the boss of the soccer club that hires him, Jean-Pierre did not need another problem in addition to the ones from his famous soccer players, Fabrice and Baco, both injured only one week before a very important match against the Paris Saint-Germain. Didier is going to help him and replace the injured players. But the real mission of Didier is to reconcile Jean-Pierre and his girlfriend Maria.

Cast 

 Jean-Pierre Bacri as Jean-Pierre Costa
 Alain Chabat as Didier / Didje Hazanavicius, the dog transformed in a human
 Isabelle Gélinas as Maria
 Lionel Abelanski as Charlie Abitbol
 Michel Bompoil as Coco
 Jean-Marie Frin as Richard Guerra
 Chantal Lauby as Solange
 Zinedine Soualem as Camel Mimouni
 Jacques Vincey as Adolf, chief of the skinheads
 Caroline Cellier as Annabelle
 Josiane Balasko as Mrs. Massart, the podiatrist-hypnotist
 Dominique Farrugia as a supporter of the Paris Saint-Germain
 Dieudonné as Jean, a sports commentator
 Serge Hazanavicius as Jean-Philippe, a sports commentator
 Jean Seaille as Bruno Miriel
 Isabelle Alexis as Barbara
 Marie-Charlotte Dutot as Camille

See also 
 The Shaggy Dog (1959), a Walt Disney film where a young boy is transformed into a dog
 The Shaggy D.A. (1976), the sequel of the previous film
 The Shaggy Dog (2006), a modern remake of 1959 film The Shaggy Dog

References

External links 

1997 films
1990s fantasy comedy films
French fantasy comedy films
French association football films
Films about dogs
Films about cats
United Artists films
Best First Feature Film César Award winners
Films produced by Claude Berri
Films directed by Alain Chabat
1997 directorial debut films
1997 comedy films
1990s French-language films
1990s French films